Zruč nad Sázavou is a town in Kutná Hora District in the Central Bohemian Region of the Czech Republic. It has about 4,700 inhabitants.

Administrative parts
Villages of Domahoř, Dubina, Nesměřice and Želivec are administrative parts of Zruč nad Sázavou.

Geography
It lies on the Sázava River, at the northern tip of the Švihov Reservoir. The municipal territory extends into three geomorphological regions: the largest part lies in the Křemešník Highlands, the northern part lies in the Upper Sázava Hills, and the eastern part lies in the Vlašim Uplands.

History
The first written mention of Zruč nad Sázavou is from 1328. The settlement was probably founded between 1032 and 1150. For a long time, it was owned by the Kolowrat family. In 1561, it was promoted to a market town and in 1662 it became a town.

After 1885, a railway was built. In 1939, Baťa company built a factory here and the town became known as an industrial centre. The footwear production lasted until 1997.

Demographics

Sights
The town is known for the Zruč nad Sázavou Castle, which is as old as the town. In 1781, the castle, especially the interiors, burned down. It was rebuilt in its present form in 1892–1894 in pseudo-Gothic style. Today it is owned by the town and serves as the town hall and gallery. The southern wing is open to the public and contains several expositions.

Notable people
Petr Linhart (born 1990), handball player

References

External links

Cities and towns in the Czech Republic
Populated places in Kutná Hora District